Fahed Dermech (born 26 November 1966 in Mahdia) is a retired Tunisian footballer.

Having spent nearly 10 years playing in Germany, Dermech made a total of 72 appearances in the 2. Bundesliga and has 18 caps for the Tunisia national football team.

References

External links 
 

1966 births
Living people
Tunisian footballers
Tunisia international footballers
Association football defenders
Association football utility players
2. Bundesliga players
Étoile Sportive du Sahel players
VfL Wolfsburg players
Eintracht Braunschweig players
TuS Celle FC players
Hannover 96 players
Tennis Borussia Berlin players
Tunisian expatriate footballers
Expatriate footballers in Germany
Expatriate footballers in Switzerland